Calypso Heat Wave is a 1957 American drama musical film directed by Fred F. Sears and starring Johnny Desmond, Merry Anders and Meg Myles.

It was an attempt by producer Sam Katzman to repeat the success of Rock Around the Clock with calypso music. It was originally known as Juke Box Jamboree.

Plot
Everything's going well at Disco Records, where singer Johnny Conroy is popular and publicity chief Marty Collins is good at her job, as well as in love with company boss Mack Adams.

Everything changes when Barney Pearl shows up. Pearl is a crude businessman who supplies records to jukeboxes coast-to-coast. He demands to be made a full partner in Disco Records or he will yank their discs out of jukes everywhere. Furthermore, he insists that singer girlfriend Mona De Luce gets to make a record of her own.

Implored not to agree, Mack goes along. Pearl keeps the pressure on, renaming the company after himself. Johnny quits and leaves on his sailboat for points unknown. Mona, meanwhile, is a much better singer than expected. Her record is a smash hit, annoying Barney, who wants her wholly dependent on him. Barney demands her career come to an end.

Marty, Mack and Mona all travel to the West Indies, where Johnny is now enjoying the sun, fun and music. Johnny suggests they begin recording calypso songs. It all works out perfectly, and when Pearl tries to cut himself in, they find a way to keep him out.

Cast
 Johnny Desmond as Johnny Conroy
 Merry Anders as Marty Collins
 Meg Myles as Mona De Luce
 Paul Langton as Mack Adams
 Joel Grey as Alex Nash
 Michael Granger as Barney Pearl 
 George E. Stone as Books
 The Treniers as The Treniers
 The Tarriers as The Tarriers
 The Hi-Los as The Hi-Los
 Maya Angelou as herself
 Dick Whittinghill as himself
 Darla Hood as Johnny's Duet Partner 
 Pierce Lyden as Hi-Fi 
 Gil Perkins as First Thug
 William Challee as Second Thug
 King Charles MacNiles as Mac Niles (as Mac Niles)

References

External links

1957 films
Columbia Pictures films
American musical drama films
Films directed by Fred F. Sears
1950s English-language films
1950s American films